Tarrauhan, also spelt 'Tarahwan' and 'Tarahuhān', was a jagir in India during the British Raj. It had an area of 67 square miles and its population was distributed in 13 villages. The capital of the state was in Pathraundi, located about 1.5 km from Karwi railway station of the Great Indian Peninsula Railway.

Tarrauhan Estate was merged into the Indian state of Vindhya Pradesh in 1948. The area covered by the former state is now in modern Chitrakoot district, at the southern end of Uttar Pradesh.

History
Tarrauhan was founded in 1812 and was located in Tarrauhan Fort, which had been a former possession of the Rajas of Panna State. It was one of the Chaube Jagirs.

It was under the Bundelkhand Agency of the Central India Agency until 1896 when it was transferred to the Baghelkhand Agency. In 1931 Tarrauhan was transferred back to the Bundelkhand Agency.

Rulers
Tarrauhan's rulers bore the title 'Chaube'.

Chaubes 
1812 – 1840 Gaya Prasad (d. 1840)
1840 – 1856 Kamta Prasad (d. 1856)
1856 – 1872 Ram Chand (d. 3 March 1872)
3 March 1872 – 22 January 1881 Interregnum
1881 –  1895 Chhatarbhuj, granted ruling powers on 22 January 1881 (d. 1 January 1895)
1895 – 1925 Brij Gopal, declared insane in 1911; the state was administered on his behalf (d. 1925)
1925 – 1968 Ganga Prasad (d. 3 January 1968)
Late MURLI MANOHAR S/O GANGA PRASAD.
(LEGAL HEIR OF CHAUBEY'S DYNASTY ARE AS GIVEN BELLOW) -

Son of Ganga Prasad was LATE-Murlimanohar choubey and his (Murli Manohar's) elder son is Rajendra Kumar Chaturvedi and younger son is Ravendra Kumar Chaturvedi
Ishwari prasad chaturvedi(saarkar) S/O RAVENDRA KUMAR CHATURVEDI.
CONT.8305226149
     7522007532
Late Murli Manohar Choubey(son) S/o Ganga Prasad, 1)
Rajendra S/o Murli Manohar)
2)SHRI-RAVENDRA KUMAR CHATURVEDI S/O MURLI MANOHAR.
3)ISHWARI PRASAD CHATURVEDI S/O RAVENDRA KUMAR CHATURVEDI
Jitendra Chaturvedi s/o Rajendra Kumar chaturvedi, Mukesh Kumar Chaturvedi  cont. 9936562510

-)Baree Bitee (Sita Rani) D/o Ganga Prasad

-)Chotee Bitee(Krishna) D/o Ganga Prasad

After Death of first wife Mother of Murli Manohar -Ganga Prasad Married to Smt Sona Devi

Children are as follows:

1)Shashi Kala (D/o Ganga Prasad)

2)Naresh Kumar Choubey (S/o Ganga Prasad)

3)Virendra Kumar Choubey (S/o Ganga Prasad)

4)Mohini (D/o Ganga Prasad)

5)Raj Kumar Choubey (S/o Ganga Prasad)

6)Rajesh Choubey (S/o Ganga Prasad)

7)Neelam (D/o Ganga Prasad)

8)Mahesh Choubey (S/o Ganga Prasad)

9)Veena (D/o Ganga Prasad)

FOR ANY FURTHER DEAITEL CONT.8305226149

See also
Bundelkhand Agency
Political integration of India

References

Chitrakoot district
Princely states of Uttar Pradesh